Dana Campbell Vineyards is a vineyard near Ashland, Oregon. Owners Patrick Dana Flannery and Paula Campbell Brown purchased the  property in 1997.

References

External links

 
 
  Dana Campbell Vineyards at Travel Oregon

Wineries in Oregon